David Remez (1886 – 19 May 1951) was an Israeli politician, the country's first Minister of Transportation, and a signatory of the Israeli declaration of independence.

Biography
Remez was born David Drabkin in the village of Kopys in the Russian Empire (now in Belarus) in 1886 and attended high school there. He studied Law in Turkey before starting work as a teacher. He moved to Ottoman Palestine in 1913, and worked as an agricultural laborer in Ben Shemen, Be'er Tuvia, Karkur and Zikhron Ya'akov.

He became involved in politics and trade unionism soon after the Mandate era began, serving as Director of the Public Works Office of the Histadrut from 1921 to 1929 as well as on Tel Aviv's city council from 1921 to 1925, and was a founding member of David Ben-Gurion's Mapai party. He became Secretary of the Histadrut in 1930, a position he retained until 1946, and also chaired the Jewish National Council from 1944-1949.

Having signed Israel's declaration of independence, Remez was appointed Minister of Transportation in David Ben-Gurion's provisional government on 14 May 1948, a position he retained after the formation of the first government following the first Knesset elections in 1949. When the first government collapsed in November 1950, Remez became Education Minister taking over from Zalman Shazar. He died in office in May 1951, the first Israeli minister to do so. His Knesset seat was taken by Menachem Cohen.

After his death several places in Israel were named after him, among them the Haifa neighborhood Ramot Remez and Remez Square in Jerusalem. His son, Aharon Remez was the second commander of the Israeli Air Force.

References

External links

1886 births
1951 deaths
Belarusian Jews
City councillors of Tel Aviv-Yafo
Educators from the Russian Empire
Emigrants from the Russian Empire to the Ottoman Empire
Farmworkers
General Secretaries of Histadrut
Israeli farmers
Israeli Jews
Israeli people of Belarusian-Jewish descent
Istanbul University Faculty of Law alumni
Jewish Israeli politicians
Jews in Ottoman Palestine
Jews from the Russian Empire
Mapai politicians
Members of the Assembly of Representatives (Mandatory Palestine)
Members of the 1st Knesset (1949–1951)
Ministers of Education of Israel
Ministers of Transport of Israel
People from Goretsky Uyezd
People from Orsha District
Signatories of the Israeli Declaration of Independence
Jewish National Council members